Lothar of Walbeck may refer to:
Lothar I, Count of Walbeck
Lothar II the Old, Count of Walbeck